Thomas Lewis Jr. (January 26, 17601847) was an American politician from Rockingham County, Virginia. He represented Virginia in the U.S. House in 1803 and 1804, after several terms in the Virginia House of Delegates representing Kanawha County.

Early and family life
Thomas Jr. was the son of Jane Strother, whose family held various political offices in Virginia, and her lawyer husband Thomas, whose father had emigrated from Ireland. Born on his father's plantation of Lynwood in what was then vast Augusta County in the Colony of Virginia, but which became Rockingham County during the American Revolutionary War.

Kanawha County voters elected him to terms in Virginia's House of Delegates.
Although he served nearly a year in Congress, his election had been contested by Andrew Moore. After some consideration in a committee, the House voted on March 5, 1804 to declare his election invalid and awarded his seat to Moore.

Electoral history

1803 - Lewis was elected to the U.S. House of Representatives with 47.03% of the vote, defeating fellow Federalist John Woodward and Democrat-Republican Andrew Moore; Moore successfully contested the result though, and was seated.

References

People from Rockingham County, Virginia
Federalist Party members of the United States House of Representatives from Virginia
1760 births
1847 deaths
Members of the United States House of Representatives removed by contest